Georg Hoerger (8 September 1897 – 14 July 1975) was a German long-distance runner. He competed in the marathon at the 1928 Summer Olympics.

References

1897 births
1975 deaths
Athletes (track and field) at the 1928 Summer Olympics
German male long-distance runners
German male marathon runners
Olympic athletes of Germany
Sportspeople from Stuttgart (region)
People from Heidenheim (district)